Markus Krauss (born September 16, 1987) is a German retired footballer who played as a goalkeeper.

Career
Krauss played in the youth for the TSV Eltingen and SV Böblingen, and graduated in 2005 the SSV Reutlingen 05 at. In the 2005/06 season Krauss increased with the A-Youth Reutlingen in the U-19 Bundesliga on. After the 2007-08 season in the Regionalliga Süd had completed 17 games for the first team of SSV, Krauss joined the then second division club TSV 1860 München . There he came for the second team on 26 Regional inserts. Krauss trained since the summer of 2009 as a guest player for the second team of VfB Stuttgart with and received on 29 January 2010 at VfB a contract until the end of June 2011th

Krauss was on 30 April 2010 at the 37th matchday of the 2009/10 season for VfB II in the third Professional league against SpVgg Unterhaching his professional debut.

For the 2011/12 season Krauss joined to the second division Fortuna Düsseldorf. He completed 22 times this season for the second team in Düsseldorf in the West Regional and rose without a separate application for the first team with the Fortuna in the Bundesliga on.

After a year in Düsseldorf Krauss closed for subsequent season the Stuttgarter Kickers on. [2] For the 2014/15 season Krauss moved to the third division SV Waldhof Mannheim.

References

External links
 
 Steckbrief auf kickersarchiv.de

1987 births
Living people
German footballers
German people of German-Romanian descent
SSV Reutlingen 05 players
TSV 1860 Munich II players
VfB Stuttgart II players
Fortuna Düsseldorf players
Stuttgarter Kickers players
3. Liga players
Association football goalkeepers